Fazal ur Rehman Khalil is a founder of Harkat-ul-Mujahideen (HuM) and current leader of Ansar-ul-Umma, which is accused of being a front organization of the banned HuM. He also runs the Jamia Khalid Bin Walid, a madrasa or Islamic seminary located in the Shams Colony of Islamabad’s Golra town which has been accused of supporting the Tehrik-i-Taliban Pakistan. He is considered to be close to the Talibans and Prime Minister Imran Khan.

He was sanctioned as a Specially Designated Global Terrorist under the Specially Designated Nationals and Blocked Persons List by the United States Department of the Treasury's Office of Foreign Assets Control; where he is listed as a maulana and qari born in 1963 in Pakistan with addresses in Rawalpindi and Islamabad.

Early life and jihad in Afghanistan
Born into a Pashtun family in 1963 in Pakistan, Fazal ur Rehman was a student in the Jamia Naumania, a madrassa in Dera Ismail Khan, when he left to join the Afghan Jihad in 1981, at the age of 16, without telling his parents, while in Afghanistan he'd fight in the ranks of commanders Jalaluddin Haqqani and Yunus Khalis as well meeting Osama bin Laden, who would become a long-time friend.

Militant activities in Pakistan
Fazal ur Rehman cofounded Harakat-ul-Jihad-ul-Islami (HuJI) in 1980 with Irshad Ahmad and Qari Saifullah Akhtar, all three had graduated from Jamia Uloom-ul-Islamia Banuri Town in Karachi. He would later go on to found and lead Harkat-ul-Mujahedeen. Fazal ur Rehman was a signatory of Osama bin Laden's 1998 fatwa called the International Front Against Jews and Crusaders.

He stepped down as emir of HuM in February 2000 and his second-in-command, Farooq Kashmiri, assumed leadership of the group.

In May 2004, Pakistani authorities arrested Fazal ur Rehman.  After six months he was released due to lack of evidence.  After Hamid and Umer Hayat reported to the Federal Bureau of Investigation in June 2005 that they had received training at an Al Qaeda camp run by Fazal ur Rehman, he went into hiding.

In March 2006, eight assailants dragged Fazal ur Rehman and his driver from a mosque in Tarnol, about three miles northwest of Islamabad. He was held for five hours, beaten and left in front of a mosque on the outskirts of Islamabad.

At the behest of the Musharraf government in 2007, Fazal ur Rehman was among a group of clerics who attempted to negotiate an end to the Red Mosque standoff.

References

Living people
Pashtun people
Pakistani Islamists
Mujahideen members of the Soviet–Afghan War
Specially Designated Nationals and Blocked Persons List
Individuals designated as terrorists by the United States government
Leaders of Islamic terror groups
1963 births